Adam Kantor (born May 27, 1986) is an American actor and singer. He is best known for his roles on Broadway, most notably Mark Cohen in the closing cast of Rent, which was captured in Rent: Filmed Live on Broadway, Motel in the 2015 revival of Fiddler on the Roof, and as an original cast member in The Band's Visit.

Biography
Kantor is from Great Neck, Long Island in New York, and describes himself as "a descendant of Jewish immigrants from Eastern Europe". He graduated from John L. Miller Great Neck North High School and Northwestern University, where he majored in theatre, in 2008. Soon after college, he landed a starring role, portraying Mark Cohen in the closing cast of the Broadway musical Rent, with the last performance made into a film, Rent: Filmed Live on Broadway. On Broadway, he has also appeared in the musical Next to Normal as an understudy and replacement for Henry.

He starred in the 2013 Off-Broadway revival of the musical The Last Five Years. 
He has also appeared Off-Broadway in the musicals Avenue Q and Falling for Eve. Kantor portrayed Motel Kamzoil in the Broadway Revival of Fiddler on the Roof at the Broadway Theater.

In 2014, Kantor joined the Jimmy Awards as a coach. With the exception of 2016, he coached ever year since he joined.

In 2017, Kantor joined the musical The Band's Visit as Telephone Guy for its transfer to Broadway. In 2018, while still in The Band's Visit, Kantor and Brian Bordainick created Story Course, an interactive musical theater dinner in New York City that tells the stories of immigrants.

Theater credits

Filmography

Awards and nominations

References

External links

Living people
American male stage actors
American male film actors
American male television actors
American male singers
Grammy Award winners
Great Neck North High School alumni
Northwestern University School of Communication alumni
Place of birth missing (living people)
1986 births